Sligo is a borough in Clarion County, Pennsylvania, United States. The population was 686 at the 2020 census.

It was named after the town and county of Sligo in Ireland.

Geography
Sligo is located in southwestern Clarion County at  (41.107700, -79.493350), in the valley of Licking Creek, a tributary of the Clarion River. The borough is surrounded by rolling hills. Formerly, the area sat upon a rich vein of coal.

Pennsylvania Route 68 passes through the borough, leading northeast  to Clarion, the county seat, and southwest  to East Brady on the Allegheny River. Pennsylvania Route 58 leads west from Sligo  to Foxburg on the Allegheny.

Demographics

As of the census of 2000, there were 728 people, 280 households, and 211 families residing in the borough. The population density was 509.9 people per square mile (196.6/km2). There were 300 housing units at an average density of 210.1 per square mile (81.0/km2). The racial makeup of the borough was 97.39% White, 0.69% Native American, 0.14% Asian, 0.96% from other races, and 0.82% from two or more races. Hispanic or Latino of any race were 1.10% of the population.

There were 280 households, out of which 38.6% had children under the age of 18 living with them, 58.6% were married couples living together, 14.6% had a female householder with no husband present, and 24.6% were non-families. 21.1% of all households were made up of individuals, and 10.4% had someone living alone who was 65 years of age or older. The average household size was 2.60 and the average family size was 3.00.

In the borough the population was spread out, with 27.5% under the age of 18, 10.0% from 18 to 24, 26.1% from 25 to 44, 21.6% from 45 to 64, and 14.8% who were 65 years of age or older. The median age was 36 years. For every 100 females there were 96.2 males. For every 100 females age 18 and over, there were 92.7 males.

The median income for a household in the borough was $30,417, and the median income for a family was $35,500. Males had a median income of $26,429 versus $21,250 for females. The per capita income for the borough was $13,807. About 15.2% of families and 17.1% of the population were below the poverty line, including 19.6% of those under age 18 and 14.8% of those age 65 or over.

References

Populated places established in 1828
Boroughs in Clarion County, Pennsylvania